The Shadow Cabinet Minister for Mental Health is a position in the United Kingdom's Shadow Cabinet that was created on 14 September 2015. It was formerly a ministerial position, before being promoted to Shadow Secretary of State for Mental Health in the May 2021 cabinet reshuffle. It was renamed to its current name in November 2021.

List of Shadow Ministers for Mental Health

List of Shadow Secretaries of State for Mental Health

List of Shadow Cabinet Minister for Mental Health

See also
 Official Opposition frontbench

Notes

References

Mental health in the United Kingdom
Official Opposition (United Kingdom)